"Calling You" is a song from the 1987 film, Bagdad Cafe. It was originally recorded by American R&B and gospel music singer Jevetta Steele. Bob Telson, the songwriter, also recorded his version. Both versions appeared on the movie soundtrack. The song was critically acclaimed and nominated for the Academy Award for Best Original Song at the 61st Academy Awards.

Jevetta Steele version

Critical reception
Film critic Julie Salamon from Wall Street Journal wrote, "The mood, dreamy and yearning, takes hold at the outset, as the terrific gospel singer Jevetta Steele sings Bob Telson's "Calling You". This theme song is hypnotic; days later you'll find it turning itself on in your head." Upon the 1993 re-release, Larry Flick from Billboard stated that "this overlooked nugget from the soundtrack to Bagdad Cafe is poised for long overdue success, thanks to its exposure in an AT&T television commercial. Steele's haunting, beautiful vocal rests comfortably atop a spare keyboard and harmonica arrangement. Don't let this one slip by a second time". Jerry Smith from Music Week declared it as a "startingly simple, but highly effective ballad", made distinctive by Steele's "hauntingly soulful vocals. Could well be an offbeat hit if given the deserved exposure." A reviewer from NME said, "Jevetta has a beautiful voice that haunts the heart with a moving and yet feminine piano accompaniment." Jim Delmont from Omaha World-Herald viewed it as "a strangely fascinating theme song". Parry Gettelman from Orlando Sentinel wrote, "Levi Seacer's production is syrupy, but Steele sings the eerily simple melody with extraordinary strength and elegance." Joe Brown from The Washington Post complimented it as "haunting", sung by the "incomparable" Steele. He added, "Okay, you can compare her to Whitney Houston - but Steele wins".

Formats and track listing

Charts

Celine Dion version

Celine Dion covered "Calling You" many times during her live performances between 1990 and 1996. The 1994 performance recorded in Olympia, Paris was included on À l'Olympia live album and released as the first and only single in December 1994.

Background and release
Dion performed "Calling You" during her concert tours in the first half of the 1990s: Unison Tour, Celine Dion in Concert, The Colour of My Love Tour and D'eux Tour. She also sang it live on few television shows over the years.

The 1991 performance in the Winter Garden Theatre was released on the Unison home video, the 1994 performance in the Olympia, Paris was featured on À l'Olympia live album and the 1995 performance in Zénith de Paris was included on the Live à Paris DVD. "Calling You" taken from À l'Olympia was also featured as B-side on Dion's 1995 singles, "Only One Road" and "Pour que tu m'aimes encore".

The "Calling You" single was released in France on 19 December 1994. It peaked on the French Top 100 Singles Chart in the last week of 1994, reaching number seventy-five. "Calling You" left the chart after five weeks. Jose F. Promis from AllMusic called Dion's version of "Calling You" unique and praised her voice calling it a "technical marvel".

In 2006, Dion's version of "Calling You" was the musical accompaniment to an Emmy Award-winning routine by choreographer Mia Michaels for the dance competition reality show So You Think You Can Dance.

It was intended to be on the Celine Dion album in 1992, but was replaced with "With This Tear" written by Prince.

Formats and track listing

Charts

Release history

References

1987 songs
1988 debut singles
1994 singles
Celine Dion songs
Paul Young songs
Live singles
Island Records singles
Columbia Records singles